Sergey Vasilyevich Karyakin (born 25 January 1991), also spelled Sergei Kariakin, is a Russian rally raid driver.

Career
He is best known for winning the 2017 Dakar Rally in the quad category for Yamaha. In the following 2018 Dakar Rally he retired after he had broken his hand in stage 5.

Since 2019, Karyakin drives on a UTV, manufactured by BRP, for the Snag Racing Team. That edition he drove steadily, finishing in the top three of the general classification and even leading once, but in the 7th stage following a car accident he could not rebound in the subsequent stages and was eventually placed 10th in the overall classification.

Dakar Rally results

References

External links
Profile on Dakar Rally

Dakar Rally drivers
Dakar Rally winning drivers
1991 births
Living people
Russian rally drivers
Off-road racing drivers